Gido is a given name. Notable people with the name include:

 Gido Babilonia (1966–2007), Filipino basketball player
 Gido Kokars (1921–2017), Latvian conductor
 Gidō Shūshin (1325–1388), Japanese Zen monk

See also
 Gino (given name)